Dorielton Gomes Nascimento (Vila Velha, March 7, 1990), known as Dori, is a Brazilian footballer who currently plays for Bashundhara Kings in the Bangladesh Premier League.

Career statistics
.

Honours

Dhaka Abahani
 Independence Cup: 2021–22
 Federation Cup: 2021–22

References

External links
 

1990 births
Living people
Brazilian footballers
Brazilian expatriate footballers
Fluminense FC players
Brasiliense Futebol Clube players
Changchun Yatai F.C. players
Clube Náutico Capibaribe players
Guangdong Sunray Cave players
Zhejiang Yiteng F.C. players
Inner Mongolia Zhongyou F.C. players
Meizhou Hakka F.C. players
Expatriate footballers in China
Brazilian expatriate sportspeople in China
Chinese Super League players
China League One players
Association football forwards